Sar Ghayeh (also Romanized as Sar Ghāyeh and Sar Qāyeh) is a village in Sarjam Rural District, Ahmadabad District, Mashhad County, Razavi Khorasan Province, Iran. At the 2006 census, its population was 1,231, in 321 families.

References 

Populated places in Mashhad County